By September 2011, there were more than 1,000 amateur leagues on every inhabited continent, in countries such as Canada, Australia, the United Kingdom, New Zealand, Germany, Belgium, Finland, Sweden and Singapore

The Stuttgart Valley Rollergirlz were the first roller derby league to be formed in Germany, and the second in Europe, being set up in April 2006.  In 2008, they assisted Bear City Roller Derby in establishing itself in Berlin, and by the end of 2009, there were seven leagues in the country. In October 2010, Bear City was accepted as the first German apprentice member of the WFTDA.

The first German Championship was held in 2010, Stuttgart beating Bear City Roller Derby 128–124 in the final.

Germany sent a team to the first Roller Derby World Cup, held in 2011, with skaters from Stuttgart, Bear City, Barock City Roller Derby, Harbor Girls Hamburg, Philly Rollergirls and Ruhrpott Roller Girls.

Leagues
 Berlin, Germany – Bear City Roller Derby
 Hamburg, Germany – Harbor Girls
 Ludwigsburg, Germany – Barockcity Rollerderby
 Stuttgart, Germany – Stuttgart Valley Roller Girlz
 Bremen, Germany – Meatgrinders
 Köln, Germany – Graveyard Queens
 Leipzig, Germany - Rolling Raptors
 Essen, Germany – Ruhrpott Roller Derby
 Frankfurt, Germany – Bembel Town Rollergirls
 Frankfurt, Germany – Frankfurt Roller Derby
 Kaiserslautern, Germany – K-Town Derby Girls
 Karlsruhe, Germany – rocKArollers
 München, Germany – Munich Roller Derby
 Wuppertal, Germany – Red Lion Roller Derby
 Mannheim, Germany - Rhein-Neckar Delta Quads

See also

 Roller derby

References

 
Germany